Z++ (pronounced zed, or zee in American pronunciation, plus plus) is an object-oriented extension to the Z specification language.

Z++ allows for the definition of classes, and the relation of classes through inheritance, association, or aggregation. The primary construct of Z++ is a class. A Z++ class consists of a number of clauses which are optional.

Z++ class structure

 CLASS ClassName
   [OWNS List_of_attributes]
   [FUNCTIONS constant_definitions]
   [TYPE type_declaration]
   [ENTENDS list_of_super_classes]
   [OPERATIONS list_of_state_change_operations_definitions]
   [RETURNS list_of_query_operations_definitions]
   [ACTIONS all_operations_declarations]
   [INVARIANT predicates]
   [HISTORY RTL_predicates]
 END CLASS

See also
 Object-Z

References

 Lano, K.C., Z++, an Object-Oriented Extension to Z''. Z User Workshop, Oxford 1990, Springer, Workshops in Computing, 1991, pp. 151–172.
 Lano, K.C., Formal Object-Oriented Development. Springer-Verlag, London, 1995.
 AAOB - Thesis 2009.

1990 introductions
Specification languages
Z notation
Object-oriented programming